Arbelodes flavicolor is a moth in the family Cossidae. It is found in south-eastern South Africa, where it has been recorded from the Impetyeni Forest in the Eastern Cape and KwaZulu-Natal.

References

Natural History Museum Lepidoptera generic names catalog

Endemic moths of South Africa
Moths described in 1925
Metarbelinae